Niels Windekilde Jannasch  (July 5, 1924 – November 9, 2001) was a German-Canadian mariner, marine historian and the founding director of the Maritime Museum of the Atlantic.

He was born on July 5, 1924, in Holzminden, Germany. Jannasch served with coastal forces in the German navy in the Second World War. After the war he sailed in merchant ships under Finnish and German flags, most notably the four-masted barque Passat during the last grain race. On this, her last commercial voyage, he served as ship's carpenter. When she was refitted as a training ship he re-joined as bosun.  He married Barbara Dierig in 1952 and the couple emigrated to Halifax, Nova Scotia.  Jannasch became the first director of the Maritime Museum of Canada in 1959 and oversaw its growth and many plans before it finally moved to a large waterfront location in 1981, and became the Maritime Museum of the Atlantic.

 

He retired in 1985 but continued to go to sea and contribute to marine scholarship in many ways. He was a founder and charter member of the Canadian Nautical Research Society. His deep knowledge and tireless contribution to many heritage organizations and made him "an icon of the maritime history fraternity in Canada and aboard." He was invested into the Order of Canada in 1991 in recognition of his scholarly and public contributions.

Jannasch died at his home in Seabright, Nova Scotia on November 9, 2001. He is commemorated by a replica sailing sloop named Windekilde and the Niels Jannasch Library at the Maritime Museum of the Atlantic.

References

Obituaries: Toronto Globe and Mail and Halifax Chronicle Herald November 12, 2001

External links
 Windekilde replica
 Obituary Argonauta, newsletter of the Canadian Nautical Research Society, Oct 2001, p.4-5

Canadian curators
Canadian maritime historians
Canadian male non-fiction writers
1924 births
2001 deaths
Officers of the Order of Canada
German emigrants to Canada
20th-century Canadian historians
Kriegsmarine personnel of World War II